

Results

Scottish Premier Division

Final standings

Scottish League Cup

Group stage

Group 3 final table

Scottish Cup

Anglo-Scottish Cup

References

 

Aberdeen F.C. seasons
Aberdeen
Aberdeen